The Algeria national handball team is the national handball team of Algeria and is controlled by the Algerian Handball Federation.

History
Algeria became a great handball country from the 1970s when they were gold medalists twice in the African Games in 1973 and in 1978. In the beginning of the 1980s, the domination of Algeria in the African handball started when it won five consecutive African titles from 1981 to 1989.
Algeria had participated in the World Handball Championship for 14 times, in the Olympic Gamess for 4 times.

Aziz Derouaz, the coach of Algeria team in the 1980s is the man who invented the Offensive-Defense style and practiced it for the first time in the 1982 World Handball Championship.

Many great players have made history of the Algerian handball such as Abdelkrim Bendjemil, Omar Azeb, Brahim Boudrali, Abdelkrim Hammiche, Mustapha Doballah, Abdeslam Benmaghsoula, Sofiane Elimam, Rédouane Aouachria, Djaffar Belhoucine, Mahmoud Bouanik, Abdeldjalil Bouanani, Salim Nedjel and many others.

Competitive record

World Championship

Olympic Games

African Championship

African Games

Mediterranean Games

African University Games
1975 – Winners

World Confederations Cup
1998 – Winners

Arab Championship
1988 – 2nd
2000 – Winners

Pan Arab Games
1985 – Silver
2007 – Silver

Islamic Solidarity Games
2005 – Gold

Current squad
The squad for the 2023 World Men's Handball Championship.

Head coach: Rabah Gherbi

Crest

References

External links
IHF profile

National team
Men's national handball teams
Handball